The hill blue flycatcher (Cyornis whitei) is a species of bird in the family Muscicapidae.
It is found in southern China, northeastern India and Southeast Asia.

It was treated as a subspecies of Cyornis banyumas before molecular phylogenetic studies found them to be distinct.

References

hill blue flycatcher
Birds of Southeast Asia
Birds of Yunnan
hill blue flycatcher
Articles containing video clips
Taxonomy articles created by Polbot
Taxobox binomials not recognized by IUCN